Catasetum cristatum, the comb-like catasetum, is a species of orchid found from North South America to North Brazil.

References 

cristatum
Orchids of South America
Orchids of Brazil
Plants described in 1826